The Renfe Class 102 or S-102  (nicknamed "Pato" in Spanish, because of its nose that looks like the beak of a duck) is a high-speed train used for the AVE service and operated in Spain by the state-run railway company Renfe, and based on Bombardier Transportation's power car technology.  Outside AVE service, Talgo markets this train as the Talgo 350.

Further production of closely related trains, differing in seating arrangement, resulted in the S-112.

Background, design and orders
The AVE Class 102 was constructed by Talgo with Adtranz (later Bombardier Transportation) providing the power car technology. It was primarily designed for the Madrid-Barcelona line.

However, its certified maximum operating speed is  due to the limits of its eight  motors. The trainsets can consist of up to 12 Talgo series VII coaches.

The train is nicknamed Pato, Spanish for duck, due to the aerodynamic design of the power cars resembling a beak. The beak design reduces noise created by air resistance at top speeds.

This top speed was supposed to be enough to fulfill the tender condition of a two-and-a-half-hour travel time between Madrid and Barcelona. Experts ascribe this reduction compared to original plans to budgetary reasons, which derive from the strongly increased power requirements at even higher speeds.

Renfe Class 112
Renfe's original order in 2004 was for 16 series units, delivery of which began in 2004. A follow-up order for 30 similar trains to be delivered in 2008-2010 and designated as class 112 (S-112). The first production unit was unveiled in June 2010.

Introduction, testing and operations
In trials with the prototype unit (later used by track authority ADIF as test train Class 330), on 11 October 2002,  was achieved.

Type approval tests began in 2004. Type approval requires test runs at speeds 10% above the desired permitted top speed.

After the successful completion of the tests, the first eight series units commenced operation on the Madrid-Zaragoza-Lleida line on 26 February 2005.

After the commissioning of the train control system ETCS L1, the top speed was increased in steps. Since 7 May 2007, the trains travel with the top speed targeted for the time being .

However, presently, non-stop runs are carried by the Class 103 trains, while the S-102 are deployed for runs with intermediate stops, with travel times between 2 hours 57 minutes and 3 hours 23 minutes.

Export

Talgo 350 trains based on the Class 102 design are being used on the Haramain high-speed railway line in Saudi Arabia under a contract announced in October 2011. The service came online in Sept 2018

See also
 Renfe Class 130
 Haramain High Speed Rail Project
 List of high speed trains

Notes

References

External links 
 
 Video of Talgo 350 YouTube

102
Talgo
Passenger trains running at least at 300 km/h in commercial operations
Electric multiple units of Spain
Electric multiple units with locomotive-like power cars
Train-related introductions in 2005
25 kV AC multiple units